The U.S. state of Washington has the sixth most members of The Church of Jesus Christ of Latter-day Saints in the United States. The LDS Church is the 2nd largest denomination in Washington, behind the Roman Catholic Church.

History

The first known member of the Church moved to Washington in 1852, with missionaries arriving in Washington Territory from California as early as 1854. Enough converts were baptized along the Lewis River in the southwest portion of the state that a congregation was created in that area. Tensions escalated to the death of one member in 1911, who was given a secret burial at night.

Members of the Church helped construct the Oregon Short Line Railroad in the 1880s. By 1930, nearly two thousand members lived within the state with chapels located in the Puget Sound Region and in Spokane. Washington saw many members move to the state after the completion of the Grand Coulee Dam and during World War II to work in defense industries.

The first branch in Washington was created at Tacoma near the end of 1899, with its first stake being created at Seattle in 1938. Washington's first temple was built in Bellevue in 1980. There are now also temples in Spokane and Richland and another to be constructed in Moses Lake.

County Statistics

List of LDS Church adherents in each county as of 2010 according to the Association of Religion Data Archives: Note: Each county adherent count reflects meetinghouse location of congregation and not by location of residence. Census count reflects location of residence which may skew percent of population where adherents reside in a different county as their congregational meetinghouse.

Missions
On July 26, 1897, the Northwestern States Mission was organized to search out Latter Day Saints who had moved to Washington, Oregon, and Montana. On January 1, 1968, The Pacific Northwest Mission was created with Joe E. Whitesides as president.  On June 10, 1970, its name changed to the Washington Mission and ultimately the Washington Seattle Mission on June 20, 1974. As of 2016, Washington is home to eight missions, three of which are east of the Cascade Mountains, and five are on the west side.

Temples

Washington currently has three temples in operation. A fourth temple, the Moses Lake Washington Temple, was announced by President Russell M. Nelson in his concluding talk of the Sunday afternoon session of the 189th annual General Conference on Sunday, April 7, 2019, to be built in Moses Lake, Washington  and is currently under construction. A fifth temple, the Tacoma Washington Temple, was announced by President Russell M. Nelson in his concluding talk of the Sunday afternoon session of the October 2022 General Conference on Sunday, October 2, 2022, to be built in Tacoma, Washington.  In addition, members in the Bellingham Washington Stake are served by the Vancouver British Columbia Temple and members in and around Vancouver, Washington are served by the Portland Oregon Temple.

See also

Religion in Washington (state)
The Church of Jesus Christ of Latter-day Saints membership statistics (United States)

References

Further reading

External links
 Newsroom (Washington)
 ComeUntoChrist.org Latter-day Saints Visitor site
 The Church of Jesus Christ of Latter-day Saints Official site

Christianity in Washington (state)
Latter Day Saint movement in Washington (state)